This is a list of airports in the Federated States of Micronesia, sorted by location.

The Federated States of Micronesia is an island nation located in the Pacific Ocean in the region known as Micronesia. The four states in the federation are: Chuuk, Kosrae, Pohnpei and Yap.



Airports 

Despite having four international airports only three serve more than one external destination, only two have destinations beyond Micronesia and only one serves beyond Micronesia and Oceania.

Minor airfields

See also 
 Transport in the Federated States of Micronesia
 List of airports by ICAO code: P#PT - Federated States of Micronesia, Palau
 Wikipedia: WikiProject Aviation/Airline destination lists: Oceania#Micronesia, Federated States of

References

External links 
Lists of airports in the Federated States of Micronesia:
Great Circle Mapper
FallingRain.com
World Aero Data

Micronesia, Federated States of
 
Micronesia
Airports